Roman Nights is a 2010 album by jazz trumpeter, composer and arranger, Tom Harrell. It is the third release with Harrell's 2010-quintet of over five years, which includes Wayne Escoffery, Danny Grissett, Ugonna Okegwo and Johnathan Blake. The album contains nine original compositions by Harrell. The title track is a flugelhorn-piano duet performance by Harrell and Grissett.

The album reached number one on the U.S. jazz radio chart in May 2010 and was included in top album lists of the year by various critics.

Track listing
All songs by Tom Harrell.

Personnel
Credits adapted from AllMusic.

Tom Harrell – composer, primary artist, producer, flugelhorn, trumpet
Wayne Escoffery – producer, sax (tenor)
Danny Grissett – piano, fender rhodes
Ugonna Okegwo – bass
Johnathan Blake – drums
Angela Harrell – producer
Joe Fields – executive producer
Dave Kowalski – engineer
Keiji Obata – design
Doug Ramsey – liner notes
Francesco Truono – photography

References 

2010 albums
Tom Harrell albums
HighNote Records albums